North Zulch Independent School District is a public school district based in the unincorporated community of North Zulch, Texas (USA).

The district has two campuses –

North Zulch High School (Grades 7-12)
North Zulch Elementary (Grades PK-6)

In 2009, the school district was rated "academically acceptable" by the Texas Education Agency.

References

External links
North Zulch ISD

School districts in Madison County, Texas